Internal troops, sometimes alternatively translated as interior troops, interior ministry forces (etc), are military or paramilitary, gendarmerie-like law enforcement services, which are found mostly in states of the former Soviet Union. Internal troops are subordinated to the interior minister (and interior ministries) of their respective countries. 

Perhaps the most prominent example, since the Soviet era have been the Russian Внутренние войска Министерства внутренних дел (ВВ) Vnutrenniye Voiska (VV) Ministerstva Vnutrennikh Del, or "Internal Troops of the Ministry for Internal Affairs" (MVD) (until 2016). Other countries that have had such forces include: Ukraine (until 2014), Georgia (until 2004), Kazakhstan (until 2014), Kyrgyzstan, Azerbaijan, Belarus, Turkmenistan, and Tajikistan. Mongolian internal troops are officially a reserve force in the Armed Forces of Mongolia. 

These forces were introduced during the Soviet era, initially to provide armed, tactical responses for the militsiya – literally "militia", but a close equivalent of the major police organizations found in other countries. Over time, internal troops also gained responsibility for waging civil war, safeguarding of highly-important facilities (like nuclear power plants), large-scale crowd control and prison security (except in Russia). As such, these forces have been involved in major wars as well as combating insurgencies and other civil unrest, including the Russian Civil War, World War II, mass repressions of Stalinist era, and the Chechen Wars. During wartime, internal troops fall under armed forces military command and fulfill the missions of local defence and rear area security.

History 
The Soviet Internal Troops were formed in 1919 under the Cheka (later NKVD, and were known as "NKVD Troops", formerly the "Internal Security Forces" (Russian: Voyska vnutrenney okhrany Respubliki or VOHR)), remained there with all the mergers and splittings of Soviet state security services and ended up under the control of the police-like MVD. The best-known of the Internal Troops divisions is OMSDON based near Moscow which traces its roots to the "OSNAZ" detachment of the VChK (formerly 1st Automobile Fighting Detachment of the VTsIK). It was later reorganized into the DON (Special-Purpose Division) of the OGPU and the NKVD.

World War II

In July 1941, formations of the NKVD were providing security for government installations, railway lines, and industrial centres. Railway security forces totalled 62,100, comprising nine divisions and five brigades securing 1,700 sites. Operational forces, the direct forerunners of the Internal Troops, included 11 regiments stationed in the western military districts, seven regiments and three battalions in the internal districts, and the F. E. Dzerzhinsky Independent Special Designation Division in Moscow (transferred from the OGPU in 1934). In October 1940, a specialised NKVD force had also been formed to assist with local air defence for important areas. By June 1941 this new Main Directorate for Local Antiaircraft Defence had three regiments, including in Moscow, and four battalions, all engineer-anti-chemical units. Another division and five brigades totalling just under 30,000 men were in the process of formation.

During World War II, most units of the NKVD Internal Troops were engaged alongside Red Army forces against Axis troops. They participated in the defense of Moscow, Leningrad, the Brest Fortress, Kiev, Odessa, Voronezh, Stalingrad, the North Caucasus and were heavily engaged during the Battle of Kursk.

Typically, NKVD Internal Troops were defensive in nature, although they played a particularly instrumental role during the Battle of Moscow, the Siege of Leningrad, and the Battle of Stalingrad where the 10th NKVD Rifle Division suffered almost 90% casualties during the battle. Large VV units also stayed in the rear to maintain order, fight enemy infiltrators and to guard key installations (such as the armament manufacturing complex at Tula, protected by the 156th NKVD regiment in 1941) and the railway installations guarded by the 14th Railway Facilities Protection Division NKVD.

Altogether, more than 53 Internal Troops divisions and 20 Internal Troops brigades were on active duty during the war. Of those, 18 units were awarded battle honors (military decorations or honorary titles). A total of 977,000 servicemen were killed in action. More than 100,000 soldiers and officers received awards for gallantry in the face of the enemy, and 295 servicemen were awarded the "Hero of the Soviet Union" title.

Cold War 
After the war's end, Internal Troops played an important role in fighting local anti-Soviet partisans in the Baltic states (such as the Forest Brothers) and the Ukrainian Insurgent Army. In 1953, the Internal Troops suppressed the Vorkuta labor camp uprising with gunfire, which resulted in death of at least 100 political prisoners.

A series of Internal Troops districts supervised many divisions, brigades, regiments, and battalions. Among them was the headquarters for Internal Troops in the Baltic area, which became Directorate Internal Troops NKVD-MVD-MGB Baltic Military District (Управление ВВ НКВД-МВД-МГБ Прибалтийского округа). This headquarters supervised several Internal Troops divisions, including the 14th Railway Facilities Protection Division from 1944 to 1951. Other divisions in the Baltic MD included the 4th, 5th, and 63rd Rifle Divisions NKVD.

In 1969, the internal forces were managed by the Main Department of Internal Troops MVD of the USSR. By an order of the Ministry of Internal Affairs number 007 of 22 February 1969 on the basis of the Internal Troops, Internal and Escort of the Interior Ministry of the Ukrainian SSR, the Ukrainian SSR and the Moldavian SSR MVD Internal Troops Directorates were officially established.

At the beginning of 1969 in the MVD were:
Internal Troops Directorates (UVV) of the MVD of the Ukrainian SSR and the Moldavian SSR
OMSDON "Felix Dzerzhinky" (Reutov, Moscow region).
19th, 36th (Moscow), 43rd (Minsk), 44th (Leningrad), 54th (Rostov-on-Don), 79th (Kirov),     80th (Kuibyshev), 83rd (Syktyvkar), 84th (Perm), 87th (Sverdlovsk), 88th (Tashkent), 89th (Novosibirsk), 90th (Kemerovo), 91st (Irkutsk), and 92nd (Khabarovsk) Convoy Divisions
Guard brigades and regiments
Special motorized militia units
Military Academies

Ten other convoy divisions were formed up to the 1990s (42nd (Vilnius), 68th Division (Gorky), 75th (Alma-Ata), 86th, 101st, 102nd, 38th, 39th, 48th, 50th and 76th (77th?) Convoy Division (Petrovsky). On January 11, 1978 was established Interior Ministry forces in the Far East and Eastern Siberia. On April 23, 1979, on the basis of Headquarters 89th Convoy Division (Novosibirsk's Military Unit Number 7540) was created the Directorate of Internal Troops (UVV) MIA Western Siberia (with the inclusion of the 90th and 102nd convoy divisions). On the basis of the 44th Convoy Division the UVV MIA North-West and the Baltic States was created.

With the beginning of the Khrushchev era and de-Stalinisation, the Internal Troops became significantly reduced in size, but retained their pre-war functions. After the Chernobyl disaster in 1986, Internal Troops personnel were among the cleanup crews ('liquidators'), engaged in security and emergency management activities; hundreds of servicemen were exposed to heavy radiation and dozens died. By 1989, with the increasing popular discontent nationwide that had begun to manifest in the USSR, the Internal Troops of the MVD, on orders from the Presidum of the Supreme Soviet, officially became a reporting agency of the MIA after years as a part of the Ministry of Defense.

On 1 October 1989, the Ground Forces' 14th Tank Division at Novocherkassk (Rostov Oblast) was transferred into the MVD as the 100th Motorised Division for Special Use VV MVD SSSR.

Prior to the 1990s, there were 180 regiments (of varying size) of Internal Troops, of which 90 were mainly guards of correctional institutions, important public facilities and public order. Some of them became engaged in the ethnic conflicts that occurred during the Dissolution of the Soviet Union. Their activities during this period included the 1989 violent incident in Tbilisi when VV servicemen used entrenching shovels to decimate a crowd of unarmed Georgian civilians.

Internal troops outside Soviet Union 

The pattern of Internal Troops was copied by many countries of the Warsaw Pact. In 1945 in Poland the Internal Security Corps was established, in East Germany a similar unit or the Volkspolizei-Bereitschaft ("People's Police Alert Units") was created in 1955.
These units were created for a further reason as well: to have additional ground troop capacities in the event of a war, that did not show up at armaments negotiations, because those internal troops were not part of the military and still had suitable and compatible equipment. There were also Internal Troops in Bulgaria.

During Cold War the West German Bundesgrenzschutz /BGS (Federal Border Guard) was a paramilitary police with infantry units as well, for a short period there was even a mandatory service in force.

Current deployments 
After the fall of Soviet Union in 1990–91, local Internal Troops units were resubordinated to the respective new independent states, except for the three Baltic countries. Azerbaijan (Internal Troops of Azerbaijan), Kazakhstan, the Russian Federation (Internal Troops of Russia), Tajikistan (Tajik Internal Troops) and Ukraine (Internal Troops of Ukraine) retained the name, organization and tasks of their Internal Troops. Up until December 2002, Armenia maintained a Ministry of Internal Affairs, but along with the Ministry of National Security, it was reorganised as a non-ministerial institution (the two organisations became the Police of Armenia and the National Security Service). Georgia detached a militarized branch from its Ministry of Internal Affairs and transferred its former Internal Troops under the command of the Ministry of Defence in November 2004. The Internal Troops of Kazakhstan was dissolved in April 2014 and was replaced with the National Guard of Kazakhstan.

Modern internal troops can partly be compared with Riot police forces all over the world.

In 2014 the Ukrainian Internal Troops were disbanded due the negative reputation gained during the Euromaidan and as part of a general military and governamental reform. They were reorganized into the National Guard of Ukraine (NGU), which still serves in similar role to the Internal Troops.

In 2016, the Russian Internal Troops, as well other units under the Russian Ministry of Interior—mainly SOBR and OMON—were transferred and merged under a new organization named the National Guard of Russia (Rosgvardiya). Differently from the old Interior Troops, the Rosgvarsyia is not subordinated to the Ministry of Internal Affairs (MVD), but under the Security Council of Russia, which in practice puts it under direct control of the President of Russia.

General organization

Despite being subordinated to a civilian police authority, Internal Troops are a military force with centralized system of ranks, command and service. The chief commander and staff of the Troops report only to the Ministry of Internal Affairs, maintaining their separate chain of command. Soviet VV units were predominantly formed up of conscripts drafted by the same system as for the Soviet Army. Modern troops in Russia and Ukraine are experiencing a slow transition to the contract personnel system. VV officers are trained in both own special academies and the Army's military academies.

The main kinds of Internal Troops are field units, prison security units, various facility-guarding units and special forces like Rus. Since the 1980s, the several special forces units that developed within the VV, were created to deal with terrorism and hostage crises. Fields units are essentially light motorized infantry, similar to respective regular army units by their organization and weapons.

Soviet prison security units (criminal slang: vertuhai)  originally consisted of the units that guard the perimeters of the prisons, and the prisoner transport teams (actually konvoi, literally "convoy"). In post-Soviet countries, some or all of the prison-related tasks were transferred to other agencies.

Internal Troops in popular culture
The Guard is a Soviet 1990 drama film, based on the real story of VV soldier who killed his entire prisoner transport unit as a result of dedovschina (brutal hazing system).

See also
 Internal Security Corps (Poland)
 National Guard
 Volkspolizei-Bereitschaft (East Germany)
 People's Armed Police (China)
 Special Corps of Gendarmes (Russian Empire)

References

Bibliography
"Internal Troops of the MVD SSSR", by William C. Fuller, College Station Papers, Defence Studies, 1983.
"Soviet Union, a County Study", Library of Congress Country Studies.

Further reading
 László Békési, György Török: KGB and Soviet Security Uniforms and Militaria 1917-1991 in Colour Photographs, Ramsbury (UK), 2002, .

External links
 Agentura.ru: Internal Troops 
 Structure of the Internal Troops 
 Nikita Astashin. The establishment, airlift, and deployment of a task force for a post-riot area: the Soviet experience in Temirtau, 1959 - the story of one of the most significant operations carried out by the Internal Troops after 1945.

Gendarmerie
Ministry of Internal Affairs (Soviet Union)
Law enforcement in communist states
Military of Russia
Military of Ukraine
Military of the Soviet Union
NKVD
Political repression in the Soviet Union